The Woman Who Cooked Her Husband is a dark comedy play written by Debbie Isitt.

Plot summary 
Kenneth and Hillary have been married for twenty years but in his middle age, Ken find himself spending more and more time with Laura. After juggling both of these relationships, Kenneth is forced to leave Hillary. Initially, Laura is everything that he could have wanted but the one problem is she can't cook. So, when Hillary invites the pair for a meal, he accepts, unaware of what she has planned to serve.

Production information 
The Woman Who Cooked Her Husband is written by Debbie Isitt and it has previously been directed by her as well.

The play is set in the 1970s. 

It was first seen in the early nineties at The Royal Court Theatre and the Edinburgh Fringe. Since then, there have been many different productions across the globe. For example, a Singaporean production hit headlines for taking inspiration from the plot and performing the play in a café.

A minimal cast is used as only three characters (Hillary, Kenneth and Laura) are featured.

References 

British plays
Black comedy plays
English-language plays